Gary Campbell (born February 15, 1951) is a former  American football player and coach. He is the former running backs coach for the University of Oregon football team.>

Education and playing career
Campbell played college football as a fullback for UCLA from 1969 to 1973.

Coaching career

1,000-yard rushers
Campbell has coached 19 players to 1,000-rushing-yard seasons; three players have done it twice, and LaMichael James did it three times, despite being suspended for the first game of his sophomore year, and missing two games due to injury in his junior year. 2001 and 2008 mark seasons when Oregon had two 1,000 yard rushers in the same season.

Bold denotes school record†Season ongoing

Players in the NFL
Campbell has coached 11 players that went on to play in the NFL.

References

1951 births
Living people
American football fullbacks
Howard Bison football coaches
Oregon Ducks football coaches
Pacific Boxers football coaches
Southern Jaguars football coaches
UCLA Bruins football coaches
UCLA Bruins football players
People from Ennis, Texas
African-American coaches of American football
African-American players of American football
21st-century African-American people
20th-century African-American sportspeople